Guillaume de Montfort may refer to:
 Guillaume de Montfort of Hainaut, first lord of Montfort l'Amaury
 Guillaume de Montfort (bishop of Paris)
 Guillaume de Montfort (bishop of Saint-Malo)

See also
 William de Montfort, 13th-century English academic